Scopula bistrigata is a moth of the family Geometridae. It was described by Pagenstecher in 1907. It is found on Madagascar and the Comoros.

References

Moths described in 1907
Moths of Madagascar
Moths of the Comoros
bistrigata